Ameal Brooks (June 3, 1904 - November, 1971) was an American baseball catcher in the Negro leagues. He played from 1929 to 1947 with several teams.

References

External links
 and Baseball-Reference Black Baseball stats and Seamheads

1904 births
1971 deaths
African-American baseball players
Baseball catchers
Baseball players from New Orleans
Brooklyn Royal Giants players
Chicago American Giants players
Cleveland Cubs players
Cleveland Red Sox players
Columbus Blue Birds players
Homestead Grays players
Newark Eagles players
New York Black Yankees players
New York Cubans players
Philadelphia Stars players
St. Louis Giants players
20th-century African-American sportspeople